Race Drivin is a driving arcade game that invites players to test drive several high-powered sports cars on stunt and speed courses. The game is the sequel to 1989's Hard Drivin' and was part of a new generation of games that featured 3D polygon environments. Unlike most racing games of its time, it attempted to model real world car physics in the simulation of the movement of the player's car. Like Hard Drivin, the game is unique among video games in that it includes a true force feedback steering wheel, an ignition key, a four-speed shifter, and three foot pedals: an accelerator, a brake, and a clutch (the clutch being a control seldom seen in any video game, then or now). Released in August 1990, approximately 1200 units were produced at the time of its release for roughly $9000 each.

Race Drivin was ported to a number of home systems in the mid-1990s, including the SNES, Amiga, MS-DOS, Game Boy, PlayStation, Genesis and Saturn. In 2005, it was included in the Midway Arcade Treasures 3 collection for the PlayStation 2, GameCube, and Xbox.

Gameplay

The gameplay resembles a driving game, featuring 4 different cars (3 with manual transmissions (speedster, roadster, and original), and 1 automatic (original)) and 3 different tracks to choose from (the regular stunt track which is very similar to the one in Hard Drivin, the Autocross track, and the Super Stunt track). The screen shows a first person perspective from inside the car, through the windshield. The cars dashboard is visible and displays the cars instruments, like the speedometer, tachometer and fuel level, as well as a few other non-gameplay important ones, such as the oil, temp, and amp dummy lights.  Each car has its own unique dashboard.

The game generally consists of racing 1 or 2 laps around the player's chosen track within the allotted time. The gameplay and vehicle operation in Race Drivin are very similar to Hard Drivin and gameplay elements such as the Instant Replay and the off-road timer are still there. A noticeable difference between the two games though is that although the car traffic in Race Drivin's stunt track is still there like in the original Hard Drivin track, the two new tracks included in Race Drivin (Autocross and Super Stunt track) are absent of any additional car traffic. Also, unlike Hard Drivins original track that offers the driver two different driving paths, the two new tracks in Race Drivin only offer one driving path per track. The finish times of the new tracks are very different as well.  The original track shared by Race Drivin and Hard Drivin takes roughly 1:30 to complete. By comparison, the Autocross track is very short requiring roughly only 30 seconds to complete and the Super Stunt track is considerably longer (taking roughly 3 minutes to complete).

Like its predecessor Hard Drivin, the game features an ignition key, a realistic manual transmission mode (which includes a 4-speed shifter (with neutral), a clutch pedal, and the possibility of stalling the car should one mis-shift) and a force feedback steering wheel, in which the driver has to all properly operate as they would in a car in real life. The cockpit version of the game also includes an adjustable bucket seat and, if it is a 'Panorama' version (of which only 100 were made), it sports 3 to 5 monitors for a full 180° peripheral view.

Enhancements
Race Drivin improved upon its predecessor in several ways:
 It had improved handling courtesy of a faster microprocessor and more efficient software. The TMS34010 used for car modeling was replaced with an AT&T DSP32C which is faster and has floating point. Instead of modeling a car with only two wheels as Hard Drivin did, Race Drivin could model a car with all 4 wheels.
 2 more tracks and 3 more cars were added. The stunts in the new Super Stunt track were either enhanced versions of the original ones (for example, Hard Drivin's 'loop' became taller, requiring more speed, and was now called a 'jump loop' because it had an open gap at its peak, and the ramp jump now had two separate landing ramps, each requiring a different speed) or new stunts entirely, like the corkscrew loop, the mountain road, and the 45° vertical hill.
 Race Drivin also introduced 'Buddy Race', where a second player could race against a previous player's recorded performance, and 'Linked Race', where by connecting a cable between two Race Drivin cabinets, players could race each other simultaneously.

Development and release
Doug Milliken, who also worked on Hard Drivin, is credited as a "test driver", but actually worked as a consultant for developing the car model. This model was used to lay out the physics of the game's car. The arcade version of Race Drivin'  was exhibited at the UK's Amusement Trades Exhibition International (ATEI) in 1991.

Reception

In North America, the arcade version was the top new video game on the RePlay arcade charts in October 1990, and then the top upright arcade cabinet from November 1990 through early 1991 to May 1991. Race Drivin' Panorama was later the top new arcade video game in August 1991.

Electronic Gaming Monthly gave the Genesis version 23 out of 50, calling it "another so-so entry in the driving scene" due to its "very choppy" scrolling.

References

External links
Race Drivin at Arcade History

Race Drivin' Resource

1990 video games
Racing simulators
Atari arcade games
Atari ST games
Amiga games
Game Boy games
DOS games
PlayStation (console) games
Sega Genesis games
Sega Saturn games
Super Nintendo Entertainment System games
Domark games
THQ games
Tengen (company) games
Time Warner Interactive games
Video games scored by David Whittaker
Video games scored by Mark Van Hecke
Argonaut Games games
Video games developed in the United States